The 2012 D.C. United Women season was the club's second season of existence, and their second in the USL W-League, the second tier of women's soccer in the United States at the time. United went undefeated in the Atlantic Division of the W-League's Eastern Conference and were division champions.

The regular season was the strongest showing by the squad in their existence, accumulating 11 wins and one draw in their 12-match season. The undefeated record resulted in United having the best regular season record in both the Eastern Conference and the Atlantic Division, as well as the second best overall record of the 30 W-League clubs. United finished the season thirteen points clear of the Virginia Beach Piranhas, the Division runners-up.

The team played the W-League Playoffs for the first time ever.

It was the final season with the club using the "D.C. United Women" moniker. In 2013, the club was rebranded as the Washington Spirit for the newly created National Women's Soccer League. The reserve team continued to play in the W-League.

Review

Preseason

W-League

Standings 

Eastern Conference standings

Atlantic Division standings

Results summary

Results by round

Match reports

W-League Playoffs

See also 
2012 in American soccer
2012 W-League season
2012 W-League Playoffs
2012 D.C. United season

References 

D.C. United Women seasons
American soccer clubs 2012 season
2012 in sports in Maryland